Calco is a comune (municipality) in the Province of Lecco in the Italian region Lombardy, located about  northeast of Milan and about  south of Lecco.

Calco borders the following municipalities: Brivio, Imbersago, Merate, Olgiate Molgora, Pontida, Villa d'Adda. It is served by Olgiate-Calco-Brivio railway station.

Demographic evolution

References

External links
 www.comune.calco.lc.it/

Cities and towns in Lombardy